Yellow badges (or yellow patches), also referred to as Jewish badges, are badges that Jews were ordered to wear at various times during the Middle Ages by some caliphates, at various times during the Medieval and early modern period by some European powers, and from 1939 to 1945 by the Axis powers, including Nazi Germany. The badges served to mark the wearer as a religious or ethnic outsider, and often served as a badge of shame.

Usage

Caliphates
The practice of wearing special clothing or markings to distinguish Jews and other non-Muslims (dhimmis) in Muslim-dominated countries seems to have been introduced in the Umayyad Caliphate by Caliph Umar II in the early 8th century. The practice was revived and reinforced by the Abbasid caliph al-Mutawakkil (847–861), subsequently remaining in force for centuries. A genizah document from 1121 gives the following description of decrees issued in Baghdad:

Medieval and early modern Europe
In largely Catholic Medieval Europe, Jews and Muslims were required to wear distinguishable clothing in some periods. Most significantly, the Fourth Council of the Lateran headed by Pope Innocent III ruled in 1215 that Jews and Muslims must wear distinguishable dress (Latin ). Canon 68 reads, in part:

Innocent III had in 1199 confirmed , which was also confirmed by Pope Honorius III in 1216. In 1219, Honorius III issued a dispensation to the Jews of Castile, the largest Jewish population in Europe. Spanish Jews normally wore turbans, which presumably met the requirement to be distinctive. Elsewhere, local laws were introduced to bring the canon into effect. The identifying mark varied from one country to another, and from period to period.

In 1227, the Synod of Narbonne, in canon 3, ruled:

However, these ecclesiastic pronouncements required legal sanctions of a temporal authority. On 19 June 1269, Louis IX of France imposed a fine of ten livres (one livre was equivalent to a pound of silver) on Jews found in public without a badge ("wheel",  or ). The enforcement of wearing the badge is repeated by local councils, with varying degrees of fines, at Arles 1234 and 1260, Béziers 1246, Albi 1254, Nîmes 1284 and 1365, Avignon 1326 and 1337, Rodez 1336, and Vanves 1368. The "rota" looked like a ring of white or yellow. The shape and colour of the patch also varied, although the colour was usually white or yellow. Married women were often required to wear two bands of blue on their veil or head-scarf.

In 1274, Edward I of England enacted the Statute of Jewry, which also included a requirement:

There is a reference to a dispensation from the badge in Erfurt on 16 October 1294, the earliest reference to the badge in Germany.

There were also attempts to enforce the wearing of full-length robes, which in late 14th century Rome were supposed to be red. In Portugal a red star of David was used.

Enforcement of the rules was variable; in Marseilles the magistrates ignored accusations of breaches, and in some places individuals or communities could buy exemption. Cathars who were considered "first time offenders" by the Catholic Church and the Inquisition were also forced to wear yellow badges, albeit in the form of crosses, about their person.

The yellow badge is different from the Jewish hat (or ), a cone-shaped hat, which is seen in many illustrations from before this date, and remained the key distinguishing mark of Jewish dress in the Middle Ages. From the 16th century, the use of the  declined, but the badge tended to outlast it, surviving into the 18th century in places.

Axis Powers

After the German invasion of Poland in 1939 there were initially different local decrees requiring Jews to wear a distinctive sign under the General Government. The sign was a white armband with a blue Star of David on it; in the Warthegau a yellow badge in the form of a Star of David on the left side of the breast and on the back. The requirement to wear the Star of David with the word  (German for Jew) – inscribed in letters meant to resemble Hebrew writing – was then extended to all Jews over the age of six in the Reich and the Protectorate of Bohemia and Moravia (by a decree issued on September 1, 1941, signed by Reinhard Heydrich) and was gradually introduced in other German-occupied areas, where local words were used (e.g.,  in French,  in Dutch).

One observer reported that the star increased German non-Nazi sympathy for Jews as the impoverished citizens who wore them were, contrary to Nazi propaganda, obviously not the cause of German failure in the east. In the Protectorate of Bohemia and Moravia, government had to ban hat tipping toward Jews and other courtesies that became popular as protests against the German occupation. A whispering campaign that claimed that the action was in response to the United States government requiring German Americans to wear swastikas was unsuccessful.

Post WWII

In May 2021, in response to the anti-vaccine movement in the United States, hatWRKS, a hat store in Nashville, Tennessee, sold badges that resembled the yellow stars with the words "Not vaccinated" on them. In response, the Stetson company announced they would no longer sell any hats to the store. This also sparked protests outside the store.

The practice of wearing yellow stars in anti-vaccine movements spread to other parts of the world, such as protests in Montreal, London, Amsterdam and Paris. The practice sparked condemnation by various Jewish advocacy groups and Holocaust survivors.

Timeline

Caliphates
717–720 Caliph Umar II orders non-Muslims (dhimmi) to wear vestimentary distinctions (called giyār, i.e., distinguishing marks)
847–861Caliph Al-Mutawakkil reinforces and reissues the edict. Christians are required to wear patches. One of the patches was to be worn in front of the breast and the other on the back. They were required to be honey-colored.
887/888 Aghlabid governor of the Emirate of Sicily orders Jews to wear on their garments and put on their doors a piece of cloth in the form of donkey and to wear yellow belts and special hats.

Medieval and early modern Europe
1215  Fourth Lateran Council headed by Pope Innocent III declares: "Jews and Saracens of both sexes in every Christian province and at all times shall be marked off in the eyes of the public from other peoples through the character of their dress."
1219  Pope Honorius III issues a dispensation to the Jews of Castile. Spanish Jews normally wore turbans in any case, which presumably met the requirement to be distinctive.
1222  Archbishop of Canterbury Stephen Langton orders English Jews to wear a white band two fingers broad and four fingers long.
1227 Synod of Narbonne rules: "That Jews may be distinguished from others, we decree and emphatically command that in the center of the breast (of their garments) they shall wear an oval badge, the measure of one finger in width and one half a palm in height."
1228  James I orders Jews of Aragon to wear the badge.
1265 The Siete Partidas, a legal code enacted in Castile by Alfonso X but not implemented until many years later, includes a requirement for Jews to wear distinguishing marks.
1267  In a special session, the Vienna city council forces Jews to wear Pileum cornutum (a cone-shaped head dress, common in medieval illustrations of Jews); a badge does not seem to have been worn in Austria.
1269, June 19 France. (Saint) Louis IX of France orders all Jews found in public without a badge ( or roue) to be fined ten livres of silver. The enforcement of wearing the badge is repeated by local councils, with varying degrees of fines, at Arles 1234 and 1260, Béziers 1246, Albi 1254, Nîmes 1284 and 1365, Avignon 1326 and 1337, Rodez 1336, and Vanves 1368.
1274 The Statute of Jewry in England, enacted by King Edward I, enforces the regulations. "Each Jew, after he is seven years old, shall wear a distinguishing mark on his outer garment, that is to say, in the form of two Tables joined, of yellow felt of the length of six inches and of the breadth of three inches."
1294, October 16  Erfurt. The earliest mention of the badge in Germany.
1315–1326  Emir Ismail Abu-I-Walid forces the Jews of Granada to wear the yellow badge.
1321 Henry II of Castile forces the Jews to wear the yellow badge.
1415, May 11  Bull of the Antipope Benedict XIII orders the Jews to wear a yellow and red badge, the men on their breast, the women on their forehead.
1434  Emperor Sigismund reintroduces the badge at Augsburg.
1528  The Council of Ten of Venice allows the newly arrived famous physician and professor Jacob Mantino ben Samuel to wear the regular black doctors' cap instead of Jewish yellow hat for several months (subsequently made permanent), upon the recommendation of the French and English ambassadors, the papal legate, and other dignitaries numbered among his patients.
1555  Pope Paul IV decrees, in his Cum nimis absurdum, that the Jews should wear yellow hats.
1566  King Sigismund II passes a law that required Lithuanian Jews to wear yellow hats and head coverings. The law was abolished twenty years later.
1710 Frederick William I abolished the mandatory Jewish yellow patch in Prussia in return for a payment of 8,000 thaler (about $75,000 worth of silver at 2007 prices) each.

Axis Powers

1939

September and October A number of local German occupational commanders ordered Jewish Poles in their areas to wear an identifying mark under the threat of death. There were no consistent requirements as to its color and shape: it varies from a white armband, a yellow hat to a yellow Star of David badge.
23 November Hans Frank ordered all Jewish Poles above the age of 11 years in German-occupied Poland to wear white armbands with a blue Star of David.

1940 
A popular legend portrays king Christian X of Denmark wearing the yellow badge on his daily morning horseback ride through the streets of Copenhagen, followed by non-Jewish Danes responding to their king's example, thus preventing the Germans from identifying Jewish citizens. Queen Margrethe II of Denmark has explained that the story was not true. No order requiring Jews to wear identifying marks was ever introduced in Denmark.

1941
June 4 Jews in the Independent State of Croatia, a puppet state of Nazi Germany, are ordered to wear "Jewish insignia".
July Jewish Poles in German-occupied Soviet-annexed Poland, Jewish Lithuanians, Latvians and Estonians as well as Soviet Jews in German-occupied areas were obliged to wear white armbands or yellow badges.
August 8 All Romanian Jews were ordered to wear the yellow badge.
August 13 The yellow badge was the only standardised identifying mark in the German-occupied East; other signs were forbidden.
September 1 Jewish Germans and Jews with citizenship of annexed states (Austrians, Czechs, Danzigers) from the age of six years were ordered to wear the yellow badge from September 19 when in public.
September 5 In Luxembourg, the German occupation authorities introduce the Nuremberg Laws, followed by several other anti-Jewish ordinances including an order for all Jews to wear a yellow star with the word "Jude".
September 9 Slovakia ordered its Jews to wear yellow badges.

1941/1942 Romania started to force Jews in newly annexed territories, denied Romanian citizenship, to wear the yellow badge.

1942
March 13 The Gestapo ordered Jewish Germans and Jews with citizenship of annexed states to mark their apartments or houses at the front door with a white badge.
April 29 Jewish Dutch people ordered to wear the yellow badge.
June 3 Jewish Belgians ordered to wear the yellow badge.
June 7 Jews in occupied France, covering the northern and western half of the country, were ordered to wear a yellow star by the German authorities.
August Bulgaria ordered its Jewish citizens to wear small yellow buttons.
November German forces invaded and occupied the Zone libre, i.e. the south-eastern half of France, but did not enforce the yellow star directive there.

1944
April 7 After the occupation of Hungary, the Nazi occupiers ordered Jewish Hungarians and Jews with defunct other citizenships (Czechoslovakian, Romanian, Yugoslavian) in Hungarian-annexed areas to wear the yellow badge.

See also

 Antisemitism in Christianity
 Antisemitism in Islam
 Cathar yellow cross
 History of antisemitism
 Jewish visibility
 Kippah
 Nazi concentration camp badge
 Zunnar

References

External links

 Distinctive Badges that Jews Were Forced to Wear During the Holocaust - Yad Vashem website
 The Jewish Badge at ThoughtCo
 Jewish medieval clothing - article by Norman Roth
 Yellow Badge in Art
 A Yellow Star of David Button, Which the Bulgarian Jews were Forced to Wear in 1941 with the Onset of the German Occupation from the Yad Vashem artifacts collection
 "Wear It With Pride, The Yellow Badge" by Robert Weltsch Juedische Rundschau, No. 27, April 4, 1933

Denmark: The king against the yellow badge
 Rescue of the Danish Jews at auschwitz.dk
 King of Denmark and yellow stars at Snopes.com's Urban Legend website

Disabilities (Jewish)
The Holocaust
Islam and antisemitism
Medieval European costume
Terminology of Nazi concentration camps
Badge, yellow